Embodied or embodiment may refer to:

Anthropology
Embodiment theory in anthropology

Cognitive science
Embodied bilingual language, in cognitive science
Embodied cognition, a theory that many aspects of cognition are shaped by the body
Embodied cognitive science, seeks to explain the mechanisms underlying intelligent behavior
Embodied design, that the actions of the body can play a role in the development of thought and ideas
Embodied imagination, a therapeutic form of working with dreams and memories
Embodied knowledge, a.k.a. tacit knowledge

Music and arts
Embodiment 12:14, a Christian Australian metalcore band
Embodiment: Collapsing Under the Weight of God, a 2008 album by the band Sculptured
Embodied music cognition, in musicology
Embodied writing, practices are used by academics and artists to highlight the connection between writing and the body

Religion
Incarnation
Anthropopathy in Islam, a religious faith in early Islam similar to the Incarnation

Other
Personification, an embodiment of an entity, usually in the form of a person.
Embodied energy, required to produce any goods or services
Embodied water or virtual water, the water used in the production of a good or service
Claim (patent), in patent law, embodiment refers to implementation of an invention
Embodied agent, an agent with a physical presence in the world (Robotics)

See also
Embodyment, American Christian rock band